The 2023 Ladies' National Football League, known for sponsorship reasons as the Lidl Ladies' National Football League, is a ladies' Gaelic football competition scheduled to take place in spring 2023.

Divisions 1, 2 and 3 are contested as single divisions; only Division 4 retains the two-group structure used in 2021 and 2022.

League structure 
The 2023 Ladies' National Football League consists of three divisions of eight teams and one (Division 4) with nine teams. In Divisions 1–3, each team plays every other team in its division once, either home or away. 3 points are awarded for a win and 1 for a draw.

Division 4 is divided into an "A" and "B" section with four teams in 4A and five teams in 4B. Each team plays each other team in its section once, either home or away. 3 points are awarded for a win and 1 for a draw.

Tiebreakers for league ranking 
If two teams are level on points, the tie-break is:
 winners of the head-to-head game are ranked ahead
 if the head-to-head match was a draw, then whichever team scored more points in the game is ranked ahead (e.g. 1-15 beats 2–12)
 if the head-to-head match was an exact draw, ranking is determined by the points difference (i.e. total scored minus total conceded in all games)
 if the points difference is equal, ranking is determined by the total scored

If three or more teams are level on league points, rankings are determined solely by points difference.

Finals, promotions and relegations 
The top two teams in Division 1 contest the Ladies' National Football League final.

The top two teams in Divisions 2 and 3 contest the respective division finals; the division champions are promoted.

The top two teams in each section in division 4 contest the semi-finals of the division. The division champions are promoted.

The last-placed teams in divisions 1, 2 and 3 are relegated.

Division 1

Table
<onlyinclude>

Division 1 Final

Division 2

Table
<onlyinclude>

Division 2 Final

Division 3

Table

Division 3 Final

Division 4

Division 4A

Table

Division 4B

Table

Division 4 Finals

References

Football
Ladies' National Football League
Ladies' National Football League seasons
Ladies' National Football League